Adipati is a noble title in Malay and Javanese. Holders include:
Adipati Soejono
Adipati Soero Adinegoro
Adipati Surabaya, see Duchy of Surabaya

See also
Adipati Dolken